Ernesto Ruffo Appel (born 25 June 1952) is a Mexican politician, who served as the 10th Governor of Baja California from 1989 to 1995. A member of the National Action Party (PAN), Ruffo was the first state governor not affiliated with the ruling Institutional Revolutionary Party (PRI) since 1929.

Born in San Diego, California, to Mexican parents, Ruffo attended elementary school in the coastal town of Ensenada in the state of Baja California. He attended college at the Monterrey campus of the ITESM graduating with a bachelor's degree in business. He became a member of PAN in 1982 and was elected municipal president of the municipality of Ensenada (the biggest municipality in Mexico with 51,952 km²) in 1986. In 1989 he was elected governor of the state of Baja California in a major upset. In the year 2000, he supported the candidacy of Vicente Fox, former President of Mexico, he was the Coordinator of Migration Affairs for the Northern Border until 2006, when Mexican President Vicente Fox's government ended. He was a Senate supply in the LX legislature, and served one term as a Senator for Baja California in the LXII and LXIII legislatures from 2012 to 2018.

References

External links
 Biography at the PAN's official website
 Ruffo at the Mexico´s Senate official website.
 Biographies of the governors of Baja California

1952 births
Living people
Municipal presidents of Ensenada
Governors of Baja California
History of Baja California
Monterrey Institute of Technology and Higher Education alumni
National Action Party (Mexico) politicians
Politicians from San Diego
American emigrants to Mexico
21st-century Mexican politicians
American people of Mexican descent
20th-century Mexican politicians
Members of the Senate of the Republic (Mexico) for Baja California
Senators of the LXII and LXIII Legislatures of Mexico